Nockels is a surname. People with that name include:

 Christy Nockels (born 1973), American singer-songwriter of contemporary Christian music, wife of Nathan
 Edward Nockels (1869-1937), American electrician and trade unionist
 Nathan Nockels (born 1973), American Christian musician and worship leader, husband of Christy

See also